Eugene Webb McGehee (March 19, 1929 – April 11, 2014) was an American judge and politician. He served as a Democratic member of the Louisiana House of Representatives.

McGehee was born in Baton Rouge, Louisiana. He attended Louisiana State University.

In 1960, he was elected to the Louisiana House of Representatives, serving until 1972.

McGehee served as the judge for the Louisiana Judicial District Court. He was awarded the Armed Forces Reserve Medal and the Louisiana Distinguished Service Medal. McGehee died in April 2014 at his home in Baton Rouge, Louisiana, at the age of 85.

References 

1928 births
2014 deaths
Politicians from Baton Rouge, Louisiana
Democratic Party members of the Louisiana House of Representatives
20th-century American politicians
Louisiana State University alumni
Louisiana state court judges
20th-century American judges
National Guard (United States) officers